Tropical Sno is a global chain of shops that serve shave ice. It was founded in April 1984 in Provo, Utah and now based in Draper, Utah.

Information
Tropical Sno has dealers located in every US state and in over thirty foreign countries. Tropical Sno has been cited as an example of microfranchising. Tropical Sno is a retail brand derived from Pioneer Family Brands, Inc.

In popular culture 
Then President Barack Obama stopped for a snow cone at Tropical Sno in Denison, Iowa, in 2012 while campaigning.

References

External links
TropicalSno-Official Website
TropicalSno-India
TropicalSno-Australia
TropicalSno-Japan

Fast-food chains of the United States
Restaurants established in 1984
Ice cream parlors in the United States
1984 establishments in Utah